A list of films produced in South Korea in 1977:

References

External links
1977 in South Korea

 1970-1979 at www.koreanfilm.org

1977
South Korean
1977 in South Korea